Domat/Ems is a municipality in the Imboden Region in the Swiss canton of Graubünden.

History 

Domat/Ems is first mentioned in 765 as colonia de Amede.  Ems is the German name for the municipality, Domat is the Romansh name and since 1943 the official name has been the combination of both.

Geography 
Of this area, 27.7% is used for agricultural purposes, while 53.8% is forested. Of the rest of the land, 12.2% is settled (buildings or roads) and the remainder (6.4%) is non-productive (rivers, glaciers or mountains).

Before 2017, the municipality was located in the Rhäzüns sub-district, of the Imboden district, after 2017 it was part of the Imboden Region.  It is located on the right bank of the Rhine river.  Until 1943 Domat/Ems was known as Ems.

Demographics 
, 18.5% of the population was made up of foreign nationals. Over the last 10 years the population has grown at a rate of 7.2%.

, the gender distribution of the population was 49.4% male and 50.6% female.  The age distribution, in Domat/Ems is; 675 people or 10.6% of the population are between 0 and 9 years old.  394 people or 6.2% are 10 to 14, and 432 people or 6.8% are 15 to 19.  Of the adult population, 819 people or 12.9% of the population are between 20 and 29 years old.  977 people or 15.3% are 30 to 39, 1,005 people or 15.8% are 40 to 49, and 888 people or 13.9% are 50 to 59.  The senior population distribution is 599 people or 9.4% of the population are between 60 and 69 years old, 376 people or 5.9% are 70 to 79, there are 180 people or 2.8% who are 80 to 89, and there are 27 people or 0.4% who are 90 to 99.

In the 2007 federal election the most popular party was the SVP which received 33.3% of the vote.  The next three most popular parties were the CVP (28.7%), the SPS (22.7%) and the FDP (12.4%).

The entire Swiss population is generally well educated.  In Domat/Ems about 68.9% of the population (between age 25–64) have completed either non-mandatory upper secondary education or additional higher education (either university or a Fachhochschule).

Domat/Ems has an unemployment rate of 1.55%.  , there were 108 people employed in the primary economic sector and about 21 businesses involved in this sector.  1,782 people are employed in the secondary sector and there are 55 businesses in this sector.  895 people are employed in the tertiary sector, with 150 businesses in this sector.

Of the rest of the population,  there are 167 individuals (or about 2.62% of the population) who belong to the Orthodox Church, and there are 54 individuals (or about 0.85% of the population) who belong to another Christian church. There are 305 (or about 4.79% of the population) who are Islamic. There are 78 individuals (or about 1.22% of the population) who belong to another church (not listed on the census), 222 (or about 3.48% of the population) belong to no church, are agnostic or atheist, and 200 individuals (or about 3.14% of the population) did not answer the question.

The historical population is given in the following table:

Languages 
Most of the population speaks German (73.3%), with Romansh being second most common (11.0%) and Italian being third ( 7.4%).

Sights

Dreibündenstein 

The Dreibündenstein (Romanish: Term bel) is a marker erected at the intersection of the Three Leagues (League of God's House, the League of the Ten Jurisdictions and the Grey League) which would found the modern canton of Graubünden. The original stone dates from 1722, and today is in the Rätian Museum in Chur. In 1742, Nicolin Sererhard mentions three stones. In 1970 a chair lift was added to mountain, making it easier to reach the marker.

Heritage sites of national significance 

The Baselgia S. Gion Baptista/Church of St. John the Baptist and the Chaplutta S. Peder/Church of St. Peter are listed as Swiss heritage sites of national significance.

The parish church of S. Gion Baptista/St. John the Baptist was built on the Tuma Turera tower.  This large guard tower was integrated into the church from the initial construction.  In the early 16th Century it was rebuilt in a late gothic style and the extensive wood carvings of the polyptych altars were added at that time.

The Chaplutta S. Pieder/St. Peter was built around 800 in a Carolingian style.  It was built on the foundation of a 7th-8th Century church, on the east side of the Tuma Casti tower.

Transportation
The last two are located at the borders of Reichenau and Felsberg respectively, serving these municipalities. All four are located on the Landquart–Thusis line; Reichenau-Tamins is the junction of that line with the Reichenau-Tamins–Disentis/Mustér line.

References

External links 

 

 
Municipalities of Graubünden
Cultural property of national significance in Graubünden